Alias Mary Flynn is a 1925 American silent drama film directed by Ralph Ince and starring Evelyn Brent. The film is considered to be lost.

Plot
As described in a film magazine review, John Reagan, Sr. adopts Mary Flynn after rescuing her from the police who wanted her in connection with a robbery. Jason Forbes, a jewel collector, attempts to use Reagan in a plot to steal a valuable gem. When he refuses, Forbes threatens to expose an incident in Reagan's past life, and then Forbes is killed. Reagan is rescued from the electric chair by Mary, who helps to capture the culprit of the murder. Mary goes on to marry Reagan's son Tim, a young district attorney.

Cast
 Evelyn Brent as Mary Flynn
 Malcolm McGregor as Tim Reagan
 William V. Mong as John Reagan
 Gladden James as Picadilly Charlie
 Louis Payne as Jason Forbes
 Wilson Benge as Maurice Deperre
 John Gough as Mickey
 Jacques D'Auray as Chief of Crooks

References

External links 

1925 films
1925 drama films
Silent American drama films
American silent feature films
American black-and-white films
Films directed by Ralph Ince
Lost American films
Film Booking Offices of America films
1925 lost films
Lost drama films
1920s American films